August John Galan (May 23, 1912 – December 28, 1993) was an American professional baseball outfielder, manager and coach.

Early life
One of eight children, Galan was born in Berkeley, California. Galan’s parents had emigrated from France in the late 19th century, and his father operated a French hand laundry on Berkeley’s University Avenue. At age 11, Augie Galan broke his right elbow playing sandlot ball. He concealed the injury from his parents, fearful of being barred from further play. The arm was never set, healed improperly, and it was never fully healthy throughout Galan's professional career. He graduated from Berkeley High School.

Minor leagues
Galan started in the Texas League and graduated to the  San Francisco Seals of the Pacific Coast League in 1932. In 1933 he was PCL Most Valuable Player, and in 1934 was purchased by the Cubs.

Major Leagues
In a 16-season big-league career, Galan posted a .287 batting average with 1,706 hits, 100 home runs and 830 runs batted in in 1,742 games played.

In 1937, Galan was the first National Leaguer to hit home runs from both sides of the plate in a game. Galan was selected to three National League All-Star teams and homered off Schoolboy Rowe in the 1936 contest to help power the senior circuit to a 4–3 victory. He also played in three World Series (1935 and 1938 with the Cubs, and 1941 with the Dodgers), but his teams never won. Galan collected four fall classic hits in 29 total at bats (.138). He reached the .300 plateau six times.

In 1935, he became the first full-time player to make 649 plate appearances and not hit into a double play, though he hit into a triple play. That year, he led the National League with 133 runs scored. Often injured (he broke his knee in 1940), Galan had a deformed arm from a childhood injury. The knee injury eventually forced him to give up batting from the right side of the plate.

Later life
After leaving the major leagues in 1949, Galan returned to the San Francisco Bay Area and played two more seasons with the Oakland Oaks of the Pacific Coast League, then managed the club to a 77–103 record (seventh place) in 1953.

Galan died in 1993 in Fairfield, California, at 81 years of age. He was survived by his wife of 40 years, Shirley, and four children.

See also

 List of Major League Baseball career runs scored leaders
 List of Major League Baseball annual runs scored leaders
 List of Major League Baseball annual stolen base leaders

References

External links
 
, or Augie Galan - Baseballbiography.com, or SABR Biography Project

1912 births
1993 deaths
American people of French descent
Baseball players from Berkeley, California
Brooklyn Dodgers players
Chicago Cubs players
Cincinnati Reds players
Globe Bears players
Major League Baseball left fielders
National League All-Stars
National League stolen base champions
New York Giants (NL) players
Oakland Oaks (baseball) managers
Oakland Oaks (baseball) players
Philadelphia Athletics coaches
Philadelphia Athletics players
San Francisco Seals (baseball) players
Sportspeople from Berkeley, California